Thomas James West (June 10, 1925–January 19, 1975) was an American politician who served in the Kansas State Senate and Kansas House of Representatives as a Republican  during the 1960s and 1970s. He was originally elected to the Kansas House in 1966, serving one term there before running for the Kansas Senate. He won election to the Senate in 1968 and won re-election in 1972 before resigning from the Senate on September 20, 1973.

References

1925 births
1975 deaths
Republican Party Kansas state senators
Republican Party members of the Kansas House of Representatives
20th-century American politicians
Politicians from Topeka, Kansas